Argentina, 1985 is a 2022 Argentine historical legal drama film produced and directed by Santiago Mitre. Written by Mitre and Mariano Llinás, it stars Ricardo Darín, Peter Lanzani, Alejandra Flechner and Norman Briski. The film follows the Trial of the Juntas, the 1985 trial of members of the military government that ruled Argentina under the dictatorship of the Proceso de Reorganización Nacional, during which the torture, extrajudicial murder and forced disappearances of civilians was a systematic occurrence; it focuses on the perspective of the prosecution team led by Julio César Strassera and Luis Moreno Ocampo, including their investigation prior to the trial.

Co-produced by Argentina, the United Kingdom and the United States, Argentina, 1985 premiered in the main competition at the 79th Venice International Film Festival on 3 September 2022, where it won the FIPRESCI Award from the International Federation of Film Critics. Theatrically released in Argentina on 29 September 2022, and in the United Kingdom and United States on 21 October 2022, it was a commercial success, debuting at number one at the Argentine box office and becoming the most-watched Argentine film of 2022. It received critical acclaim, and won, among others, the Golden Globe Award for Best Foreign Language Film, the Goya Award for Best Ibero-American Film and the National Board of Review Freedom of Expression Award. It was also named one of the top five international films of 2022 by the National Board of Review, and received an Academy Award nomination for Best International Feature Film.

Synopsis
Based on real events, the story follows the events surrounding the 1985 Trial of the Juntas, which prosecuted the ringleaders of Argentina's last civil-military dictatorship (1976–1983), and centers on the titanic work of a group of non-lawyers aged 20 to 27, led by prosecutors Julio César Strassera and Luis Moreno Ocampo against those responsible for the bloodiest dictatorship in the history of Argentina. The narration reflects on the true meaning in the concepts of memory, truth and justice under the slogan "Nunca más" ('Never again').

Plot

In 1985, Argentina has had a democratic government for less than two years after its last military dictatorship. Public prosecutor Julio César Strassera is chosen to make the government's case against the military junta for alleged crimes against humanity after the military courts declined to press charges. The junta have retained the services of senior, experienced lawyers, while Strassera struggles to find lawyers to form his prosecution team amongst Argentina's largely conservative legal community. Strassera meets Luis Moreno Ocampo, his assigned deputy prosecutor, but initially rejects his offer for help, particularly after learning of his family's strong military ties and their support for the junta. Strassera receives several death threats, leading the government to assign him a security detail for him and his family.

Finding no other lawyers, Strassera decides to accept Moreno Ocampo's offer of help. Moreno Ocampo, a professor, suggests that they look for young law graduates and inexperienced lawyers, as the senior lawyers are unwilling to risk their reputations or safety to sign on to a trial that is so divisive amongst the public. 

Slowly, Strassera and Moreno Ocampo interview and assemble a young team, many of whom are working in government offices and are able to use their access to materials to help the case. Because the atrocities were committed across the country, Strassera and his team map out areas where military prison camps were, and interview and seek out as many victims of the junta as they can to record their testimonies. Meanwhile, he and his team face serious risks to their safety, with several of them being followed, and Moreno Ocampo's family turning on him for going against their military history.

On the first day of the trial, the court receives a bomb threat, which Strassera argues is a fake one phoned in by supporters of the military to postpone the trial. He manages to persuade the reluctant judges that the trial must continue. The trial is fully recorded on cameras and parts of it are broadcast around the world. Many of the victims of the junta testify about the brutal and senseless torture they endured or witnessed happening to their families and loved ones. President Raúl Alfonsín invites Strassera to meet with him and informs him that he is keeping a close watch on the court events as they unfold and was deeply moved by the testimony of the witnesses. Despite this, the Attorney General later intimates to Strassera that he should be lenient with the Air Force. Strassera is angered and makes vulgar gestures at the Air Force generals in court, threatening to get himself thrown out of the courtroom for contempt. 

For his closing argument, Strassera realizes that he will have the chance to make his case not just to the judges in the courtroom, but to the people of Argentina and those around the world. With the help of his family, he composes an eloquent closing statement: "I wish to waive any claim of originality in closing this indictment. I wish to use a phrase that is not my own, because it already belongs to all the Argentine people. Your Honors: ¡Nunca más!".

The judges move into deliberations and Strassera's team is desperate to hear the outcome. Strassera's son spies on the judges in a restaurant and witnesses them coming to an agreement of sorts; it is not clear to him what happens, but it later shown that the judges agreed to continue prosecuting crimes committed under the military junta.

Strassera is summoned to the hospital as his elderly friend is dying. His friend presses Strassera to know the final sentences, as he will soon die and not be able to tell anyone. Strassera lies and tells his friend that all the generals received life sentences, including the Air Force. Shortly after, Strassera learns that the court is sentencing General Jorge Videla and Admiral Emilio Massera to life imprisonment, General Roberto Viola to seventeen years, Admiral Armando Lambruschini to eight years, and General Orlando Agosti to four and a half years. Dissatisfied with most of the outcomes, he begins typewriting an appeal.

Cast

Release
Argentina, 1985 had its world premiere in the main competition for the Golden Lion at the 79th Venice International Film Festival on 3 September 2022. It was theatrically released in Argentina on 29 September 2022. Amazon Studios released the film in select theaters in the United States on 30 September 2022, before it started streaming on Prime Video on 21 October 2022.

Reception

Critical reception
According to the review aggregation website Rotten Tomatoes, Argentina, 1985 has a 95% approval rating based on 64 reviews from critics, with an average rating of 8/10. The site's consensus reads, "Justice is served in Argentina 1985, a crusading courtroom drama that shines a light on historically somber times with refreshing levity". On Metacritic, which uses a weighted average, the film holds a score of 78 out of 100 based on 11 reviews indicating "generally favorable reviews".

Box office
The film was released theatrically in Argentina on 29 September 2022. In its first weekend in theaters, the film debuted at number one at the box office and was seen by 200,000 spectators in 298 theaters, making it the best opening for a national film since the start of the COVID-19 pandemic. During its second weekend, the film maintained its first place at the box office and reached a little more than 211,000 viewers in 314 theaters. By November 2022, the film had sold over a million tickets in Argentina, grossing a total of 592 million pesos (US$3,2 million). It was the most-watched Argentine film of 2022, and the ninth most-watched film overall in Argentina in 2022.

Accolades

See also
 List of Argentine films of 2022
 List of submissions to the 95th Academy Awards for Best International Feature Film
 List of Argentine submissions for the Academy Award for Best International Feature Film
The Official Story – 1985 film also dealing with the dictatorship that won the country's first Academy Award

References

External links
 

2022 films
2020s Spanish-language films
2022 drama films
2020s legal drama films
2020s Argentine films
2020s American films
2020s British films
Amazon Studios films
Amazon Prime Video original films
2020s historical drama films
2022 biographical drama films
Argentine biographical drama films
Argentine historical drama films
American biographical drama films
British biographical drama films
Argentine films based on actual events
American films based on actual events
British films based on actual events
American legal drama films
American historical drama films
British historical drama films
American courtroom films
British courtroom films
Films set in Argentina
Films about Latin American military dictatorships
Films set in the 1980s
Films set in 1984
Films set in 1985
Works about prosecutors